Bezirk Urfahr-Umgebung is a district of the state of 
Upper Austria in Austria. It is named after Urfahr, a former city, today a borough of Linz, seat of the district's administration (Bezirkshauptmannschaft).

Municipalities
Towns (Städte) are indicated in boldface; market towns (Marktgemeinden) in italics.
Alberndorf in der Riedmark
Altenberg bei Linz
Bad Leonfelden
Eidenberg
Engerwitzdorf
Feldkirchen an der Donau
Gallneukirchen
Goldwörth
Gramastetten
Haibach im Mühlkreis
Hellmonsödt
Herzogsdorf
Kirchschlag bei Linz
Lichtenberg
Oberneukirchen
Ottenschlag im Mühlkreis
Ottensheim
Puchenau
Reichenau im Mühlkreis
Reichenthal
Schenkenfelden
Sonnberg im Mühlkreis
Sankt Gotthard im Mühlkreis
Steyregg
Vorderweißenbach
Walding
Zwettl an der Rodl

 
Districts of Upper Austria